|}

The Mares Champion Hurdle is a Grade 1 National Hunt hurdle race in Ireland which is open to mares aged four years or older. It is run at Punchestown Racecourse over a distance of about 2 miles and 4 furlongs, and during its running there are twelve hurdles to be jumped. The race is scheduled to take place each year in late April or early May.

The race was first run in 2004.  It was initially a Listed race, was awarded Grade 3 status in 2006, and then fast-tracked to Grade 1 in 2013. It was initially contested over 2 miles and 2 furlongs, and was increased to the present distance in 2017.

Records
Most successful horse (2 wins):
 Annie Power – 2014, 2015
 Benie Des Dieux -  2018, 2019 

Leading jockey  (5 wins):
 Paul Townend –  Tarla (2010), Glens Melody (2013), Whiteout (2016), Benie Des Dieux (2018, 2019) 

Leading trainer  (8 wins):
 Willie Mullins - Tarla (2010), Glens Melody (2013), Annie Power (2014, 2015), Whiteout (2016), Benie Des Dieux (2018, 2019), Stormy Ireland (2021)

Winners

See also 
 Horse racing in Ireland
 List of Irish National Hunt races

References
Racing Post

National Hunt hurdle races
National Hunt races in Ireland
Punchestown Racecourse
2004 establishments in Ireland
Recurring sporting events established in 2004